The environment of Indonesia consists of 17,508 islands scattered over both sides of the equator. Indonesia's size, tropical climate, and archipelagic geography, support the world's second highest level of biodiversity after Brazil.

Issues
Indonesia's large and growing population and rapid industrialisation present serious environmental issues, which are often given a lower priority due to high poverty levels and weak, under-resourced governance. Issues include large-scale deforestation (much of it illegal) and related wildfires causing heavy smog over parts of western Indonesia, Malaysia and Singapore; over-exploitation of marine resources; and environmental problems associated with rapid urbanisation and economic development, including air pollution, traffic congestion, garbage management, and reliable water and waste water services. Deforestation and the destruction of peatlands make Indonesia the world's third largest emitter of greenhouse gases. Habitat destruction threatens the survival of indigenous and endemic species, including 140 species of mammals identified by the World Conservation Union (IUCN) as threatened, and 15 identified as critically endangered, including the Sumatran Orangutan.

Indonesia has a below average but slightly improving performance in the global Environmental Performance Index (EPI) with an overall ranking of 107 out of 180 countries in 2016. This is also below average in the Asia Pacific region, behind Thailand but slightly ahead of China. The EPI was established in 2001 by the World Economic Forum as a global gauge to measure how well individual countries perform in implementing the United Nations' Sustainable Development Goals. The environmental areas where Indonesia performs worst (ie. highest ranking) are water resource management (128), environmental effects of fisheries (127) and forest management (109), followed closely by sanitation. Waste water treatment plans are expected to improve conditions a bit in the future. Indonesia performs best (ie. lowest ranking) in the area of climate and energy (41), mostly due to the excellent access to electricity, less so for CO2 emission levels from power production. Health impacts of environmental issues (78) and biodiversity and habitat (83) also ranks above average.

Climate Change 

Indonesia is at serious risk from the projected effects of climate change. If emissions go unreduced, it is predicted that it will see an average temperature rise of around 1℃ by the middle of the century, 0.3℃ per decade. This amounts to almost double the frequency of extremely hot days (with temperatures above 35℃, 95 °F) per year by 2030, a figure which is predicted to rise to nearly one in three days by the end of the century. Rising temperatures risk increasing the frequency and severity of draught and food shortages, as it will have (and already has already had) a serious impact on precipitation and the patterns of wet and dry seasons upon which the Indonesian agricultural system is based. It will also encourage diseases, such as dengue fever and malaria, and increases in wild-fires, which threaten the huge areas of rainforest in the country.

Climate change is having and will have further serious impact in the form of rising sea levels. As Indonesia is the world’s largest archipelago state, at current rates, rising sea levels will result in 42 million Indonesian households over 2000 islands being at risk of submersion by the middle of this century. Over 60% of Indonesia’s population live in low-lying coastal areas, including Jakarta, which is particularly at risk, as 40% of the city is below sea-level and is rapidly subsiding, putting a huge number of people at risk of displacement.

All of this is likely to affect poorer communities the most. Over 50% of the population of Indonesia live on less than US$2 per day, and the poor will bear the brunt of the disastrous effects of climate change, including death, illness and displacement, “as they are typically the most vulnerable to the impacts of drought, floods, and landslides and pursue livelihoods that are highly dependent on climate-sensitive sectors (i.e fisheries and forestry)”

Deforestation

Environmental policy and law

Treaties and international agreements
Indonesia is a signatory to a number of treaties and international agreements:
Party to - Biodiversity, Climate Change, Desertification, Endangered Species, Hazardous Wastes, Law of the Sea, Nuclear Test Ban, Ozone Layer Protection, Ship Pollution, Tropical Timber 83, Tropical Timber 94, Wetlands
Signed, and ratified - Climate Change-Kyoto Protocol
Signed, but not ratified - Marine Life Conservations

Domestic environmental policy

In 2020 the rate of deforestation in Indonesia was the slowest since 1990. It was 75% lower than in 2019. This is because the government stopped issuing new licences to cut forests, including for palm oil plantations. The falling price of palm oil facilitated making it. Very wet weather reduced wildfires what also contributed to the achievement.

See also

 Agricultural Involution: The Processes of Ecological Change in Indonesia (book)
 Biodiversity of Borneo
 Environmental issues in Indonesia
 Greenlifestyle
 Mangroves of the Straits of Malacca
 Fauna of Indonesia
 Flora of Indonesia
 Climate of Indonesia
 Geography of Indonesia
 Protected areas of Indonesia

References

External links
 Indonesia Green Business Network